Wellington—Halton Hills is a provincial electoral district in western Ontario, Canada.  It elects one member to the Legislative Assembly of Ontario.

The riding, which was first contested in the 2007 provincial election, consists of the municipalities of Guelph/Eramosa, Puslinch, Erin, Centre Wellington and Halton Hills.

47.5% of the riding came from Halton, 25.2% came from Waterloo—Wellington, 16.3% came from Guelph—Wellington and 11% came from Dufferin—Peel—Wellington—Grey. Although it is counted as a Midwestern Ontario riding, the Halton Hills portion is part of the Greater Toronto Area.

Members of Provincial Parliament

Election results

		

	
		

|align="left" colspan=2|Progressive Conservative hold  
|align="right"|Swing
|align="right"|  -0.42
|

^ Change based on redistributed results

2007 electoral reform referendum

Sources

Elections Ontario Past Election Results
Map of riding for 2018 election

Ontario provincial electoral districts
Centre Wellington
Halton Hills